A standard operating procedure (SOP) is a set of step-by-step instructions compiled by an organization to help workers carry out routine operations. SOPs aim to achieve efficiency, quality output, and uniformity of performance, while reducing miscommunication and failure to comply with industry regulations.

Some military services (e.g., in the U.S. and the UK) use the term standing (rather than standard) operating procedure, since a military SOP refers to a unit's unique procedures, which are not necessarily standard to another unit. The word "standard" could suggest that only one (standard) procedure is to be used across all units.

The term is sometimes used facetiously to refer to practices that are unconstructive, yet the norm. In the Philippines, for instance, "SOP" is the term for pervasive corruption within the government and its institutions.

Clinical research and practice
In clinical research, the International Council for Harmonisation (ICH) defines SOPs as "detailed, written instructions to achieve uniformity of the performance of a specific function". SOPs usually get applied in pharmaceutical processing and for related clinical studies. There the focus is always set on repeated application of unchanged processes and procedures and its documentation, hence supporting the segregation of origins, causes and effects. Further application is with triage, when limited resources get used according to an assessment on ranking, urgence and staffing possibilities.  Study director is mainly responsible for SOPs. The Quality Assurance Unit are individuals who are responsible for monitoring whether the study report and tests are meeting the SOP.

SOPs can also provide employees with a reference to common business practices, activities, or tasks. New employees use an SOP to answer questions without having to interrupt supervisors to ask how an operation is performed. The international quality standard ISO 9001 essentially requires the determination of processes (documented as standard operating procedures) used in any manufacturing process that could affect the quality of the product.

Health safety and environment
Procedures are extensively employed to assist with working safely. They are sometimes called "safe work methods statements" (SWMS, pronounced as 'swims'). Their development is usually preceded by various methods of analyzing tasks or jobs to be performed in a workplace, including an approach called job safety analysis, in which hazards are identified and their control methods described. Procedures must be suited to the literacy levels of the user, so the readability of procedures is important.

See also

References

External links
 ICH Guidance E6: Good Clinical Practice: Consolidated guideline
 European Medicines Agency Guideline for Good Clinical Practice

Clinical research
Military terminology
Pharmaceutical industry
Operating procedures
Good clinical practice